Rust Communications is an American privately owned media company based in Cape Girardeau, Missouri.  The Southeast Missourian is its flagship publication.

The company has its origins in 1967, when Gary Rust and his wife Wendy purchased the small Cape Girardeau Weekly Bulletin.  In 1982, he purchased his first daily paper, the Dexter Statesman.  In 1986, he purchased the Southeast Missourian, the daily paper in town, from Thomson Newspapers.

By 1993, the company owned part or all of four newspapers. As of 2009, the family-owned company had full or part ownership of 18 daily papers, 30 weekly papers, and 17 radio stations in eight states.

In 2001, Gary Rust retired from daily management of the company, and turned over the reins to sons Jon, who is on the Board Of Directors for the Associated Press, and Rex Rust, as well as COO Walter Lage.  In 2003, Rust was inducted into the Missouri Press Association's Newspaper Hall of Fame.

Newspapers
Holdings of Rust Communications include the following daily newspapers:

Arkansas
 Blytheville Courier News  (acquired 1994)

Indiana
 The Brazil Times (acquired 2001)
 Greencastle Banner-Graphic (acquired 1999)
 Greene County Daily World (formed 2007)

Iowa
 LeMars Daily Sentinel (acquired 1997)
 Spencer Daily Reporter
 Storm Lake Pilot Tribune
 Cherokee Chronicle Times
 Dickinson County News

Kansas
 Fort Scott Tribune (acquired 2004)

Missouri
 Dexter Statesman (Dexter, Missouri) (acquired 1982)
 Southeast Missourian (purchased 1986)
 Marshall Democrat News (purchased 1997)
 Nevada Daily Mail (purchased 1997)
 Monett Times (acquired 2009)
 The Concordian
 The Banner Press

Nebraska
 McCook Daily Gazette (acquired 1997)

References

Mass media companies of the United States
Family-owned companies of the United States